The Hyŏngbong Line is an electrified railway line of the Korean State Railway in Tŏkch'ŏn-si, South P'yŏngan Province, North Korea, running from Ch'ŏlgisan on the Sŏch'ang Line to Hyŏngbong.

Services

Local passenger trains 723/724 operate between Tŏkch'ŏn on the P'yŏngdŏk Line and Hyŏngbong via the Sŏch'ang Line.

Route 

A yellow background in the "Distance" box indicates that section of the line is not electrified.

References

Railway lines in North Korea
Standard gauge railways in North Korea